The Estonian Evangelical Lutheran Church (EELC; Estonian: Eesti Evangeelne Luterlik Kirik, abbreviated EELK) is a Lutheran church in Estonia. EELC is member of the Lutheran World Federation and belongs to the Community of Protestant Churches in Europe. It is also a member of the Porvoo Communion, putting it in full communion with the Church of England and other Anglican churches in Europe.

History
The Estonian Evangelical Lutheran Church (EELC) was constituted in 1949, when the previous church hierarchy, Eesti Evangeeliumi Luteriusu Kirik, which was formed in 1919 and headed by bishop Johan Kõpp, had escaped to Sweden in 1944. When the Soviet Union invaded Estonia in 1940, most Christian organizations were dissolved, church property was confiscated, theologians were exiled to Siberia, and religious education programs were outlawed. World War II later brought devastation to many church buildings.  It was not until 1988 that church activities were renewed when a movement for religious tolerance began in the Soviet Union.

Although women had studied theology at Tartu University in the 1920s and some had sought ordination as priests, it was not until 1967 that the first woman, Laine Villenthal, was ordained. In 2014, the church reported that there were 169 men and 43 women serving as ministers.

Leadership
The Church of Estonia is episcopal in polity, and is led by five bishops, including the archbishop who serves as the Primate. The archbishop has overall authority, and under his authority there are four jurisdictions, each with its own Bishop.

Following the retirement of Andres Põder as archbishop, the current archbishop is Urmas Viilma, consecrated on 2 February 2015.

During the Soviet occupation of Estonia, the Archbishop went into exile, which resulted in the formation of a parallel church, the Estonian Evangelical Lutheran Church Abroad. Until 2010 this body was independent, with its own Archbishop based in Canada. In 2010 the two churches reunited, and the former overseas church became a diocese of the Estonian Evangelical Lutheran Church, known as the Extra-Estonian Diocese.

Bishops and Archbishops of Tallinn and Primates
Jaan Kiivit Sr. (1949–1967) (First Archbishop)
Alfred Tooming (1967–1977)
Edgar Hark (1978–1986)
Kuno Pajula (1987–1994)
Jaan Kiivit Jr. (1994–2005)
Andres Põder (2005–2014)
Urmas Viilma (2015–present)

Membership
As of February 2009, the EELC reported approximately 160,000 baptized members and the EELC Abroad (based in Canada) reported approximately 8,000 baptized members. A previous figure broke down the EELC Abroad into 3,508 members with 12 clergy in the USA and 5,536 members with 11 clergy in Canada. In 2014, the Lutheran World Federation reported the number of registered members as being 180,000. The church reported that it had served 143,895 communicants.

Social issues 
The church has both theologically conservative and liberal members. The church does ordain women to the priesthood, unlike the more conservative Evangelical Lutheran Church of Latvia and Evangelical Lutheran Church of Lithuania. In an interview, Archbishop Urmas Viilma stated that the church allows women ordination and "will continue to do so". The church disapproves of homosexual unions, believing marriage is the sacred union of a man and a woman. It only allows celibate gay ministers to be ordained. However, Archbishop Viilma did state that if same-sex marriage is legalized in the country, "then the church will clearly need to redefine itself", but he also stated that "we clearly interpret the Bible to say that practicing homosexuality is sin...but we all are equal in God’s eyes and welcome in church." Archbishop Viilma announced his support for civil unions and agreed to be a part of a panel working in 2021 on a proposal to pass a bill to define marriage as heterosexual and to strengthen the civil partnership registration with equal rights for same-sex couples. The Lutherans leaned toward opposing the death penalty, although they took no official stance, and the church does not have a committee "dealing with social-political questions".

References

External links
 Official website
 The History Files Churches of Estonia
 Map of Church in Tallinn
 Map of Church in Tartu

1940s establishments in Estonia
1949 establishments in the Soviet Union
Christian organizations established in 1949
Lutheran denominations established in the 20th century
Lutheran World Federation members
Lutheranism in Estonia
Members of the World Council of Churches
Organizations based in Tallinn
Religion in Tallinn